Jože Ciuha (26 April 1924 – 12 April 2015) was a Slovenian painter.

Biography 
Jože Ciuha was born in Trbovlje. In 1950 he graduated from the Academy of Fine Arts in Ljubljana. During his career he traveled extensively, his artistic style influenced by time spent in Macedonia as a student, as well as Paris and the Far East in the 1950s, and North and South America during the 1960s. Ciuha taught at the International Summer Academy in Salzburg in the 1970s, as well as Western Michigan University, and the International Graphic School in Venice and Academy of Fine Arts in Ljubljana.

Ciuha worked with a variety of media, including watercolour, drawing, illustration, mosaic, and tapestry. He also produced poetry and other writings. His work has been exhibited prolifically, and it is held at several major international art institutions.

References

1924 births
2015 deaths
Slovenian male painters
People from Trbovlje
20th-century Slovenian painters
20th-century Slovenian male artists
21st-century Slovenian painters
21st-century Slovenian male artists
Western Michigan University faculty